The rufous-tailed flatbill (Ramphotrigon ruficauda) is a species of bird in the family Tyrannidae.
It is found in Bolivia, Brazil, Colombia, Ecuador, French Guiana, Guyana, Peru, Suriname, and Venezuela.
Its natural habitat is subtropical or tropical moist lowland forests.

Rufous-tailed flatbill is a fairly common flycatcher of lowland forest in northern South America.  It is somewhat solitary in areas of open understory in varzea and terra firme lowland humid forest, primarily in the Orinoco and Amazon drainages.  The species is a distinctive, small flycatcher, mostly olive on the body with an obviously rufous tail and blackish wings with rufous edging.  The rufous-tailed flatbill is most frequently located by its call, a two-part whistle with the first part long and rising and the second part lower and abbreviated.

Habitat
It occurs in humid lowland evergreen forest. It usually forages in the midstory of terra firme forest. It prefers sites with an open understory.

Systematics
The genus Ramphotrigon used to be considered to be related to Tolmomyias and Rhynchocyclus, two other genera of small tyrant flycatchers with broad bills . It is proposed that Ramphotrigon was more closely related to Myiarchus, due to shared derived features of the cranium and syrinx, and to shared similarities in nest site. Two recent phylogenetic analyses of DNA sequence data yielded somewhat incongruent information on the relationships of Ramphotrigon. Both studies confirmed, however, that Ramphotrigon is not at all closely related to Tolmomyias or Rhynchocyclus. It is found that Ramphotrigon is basal to a clade that includes Myiarchus (as well as Tyrannus and related genera),

Vocalizations
Call or day song is a low-pitched whistle. This vocalization has been described as "a softly whistled, drawn-out weeeaaaweee, sometimes followed by [a] brief low note, has wheezy quality", and as "a low, rising-falling or slightly quavering, mewing whistle: meeooo, or with terminal emphasis: meeooo'OO . The dawn song is similar to "an alternating mournful toooo, reer; wheeee-oooh, the last two notes being like the normal daytime song"  or "a low mewing whistle ending with a higher hiccup: meeoooOOoo'WEEpur!"

Similar species
The sharply two-toned basic pattern of the rufous-tailed flatbill - an olive-green bird with a bright rufous tail and wings - is distinctive and easily identifiable. Compare to dusky-tailed flatbill (Ramphotrigon fuscicauda), which has dusky rectrices and remiges and a more heavily streaked breast.

References

Neotropical Birds. . 16:33, 7 December 2011 (UTC)

rufous-tailed flatbill
Birds of the Amazon Basin
Birds of the Guianas
rufous-tailed flatbill
Birds of Brazil
Taxonomy articles created by Polbot